Gordon Leo McDonough (January 2, 1895 – June 25, 1968) was an American politician who served as a U.S. Representative from Californiafrom 1945 to 1963.

Early life and career
Born in Buffalo, New York, McDonough moved with his parents to Emporium, Pennsylvania, in 1898. He attended the public schools and graduated from the high school at Emporium, Pennsylvania.

He engaged as an industrial chemist at Emporium, Pennsylvania from 1915 to 1918. He moved to Los Angeles, California, and resumed his former occupation from 1918 to 1933. He served as member of the Los Angeles County Board of Supervisors from 1933 to 1944, serving as chairman for one year.

Congress 
McDonough was elected as a Republican to the Seventy-ninth and to the eight succeeding Congresses (January 3, 1945 – January 3, 1963). He was an unsuccessful candidate for re-election in 1962 to the Eighty-eighth Congress when he was defeated by Democrat Edward Roybal. McDonough voted in favor of the Civil Rights Acts of 1957 and 1960, as well as the 24th Amendment to the U.S. Constitution.

Private life
Married to Catherine McNeil, he raised seven children.

McDonough appeared on the Groucho Marx game show You Bet Your Life on January 4, 1950.

Death
He died in Bethesda, Maryland, June 25, 1968, and was interred in Holy Cross Mausoleum, Los Angeles, California.

References

1895 births
1968 deaths
Politicians from Buffalo, New York
Los Angeles County Board of Supervisors
Republican Party members of the United States House of Representatives from California
20th-century American politicians
People from Emporium, Pennsylvania
Catholics from New York (state)
Catholics from California
Catholics from Pennsylvania